Show is a live album by Allison Moorer, released June 24, 2003. The album peaked at No. 49 on the Billboard Top Country Albums chart in July 2003. According to Vogue, this album features the first recorded collaboration between Moorer and her sister, Shelby Lynne.

Critical reception

Thom Jurek of AllMusic begins his review with, "On Show, singer/songwriter Allison Moorer follows up her stellar Miss Fortune album with a live collection recorded at Music City's famed 12th & Porter. Playing songs drawn from her three previous studio outings, she also includes a tough and trashy version of Neil Young's barroom classic "Don't Cry No Tears."" and concludes with "In sum, this is how live records should be made."

No Depression reviews the album and writes, "Culled from two sets at Nashville’s 12th & Porter nightclub on January 4 of this year (2003), the disc presents Moorer in a mostly unfettered setting that lets her musical starlight shine. The backing is somewhat slick but mainly just exquisite, and producer R.S. Field coaxes a studio-worthy sound out of a live setup."

Track listing

Musicians

Allison Moorer – vocals, guitar
Jared Reynolds – bass, vocals
Paul Griffith – drums
Joe McMahan – guitar
Eric Holt – keyboards, vocals
Pete Finney – pedal steel guitar, guitar
Manfred Jerome – percussion

Track information and credits adapted from the album's liner notes.

Charts

References

External links
Allison Moorer Official Site
Universal Music Group Official Site

Allison Moorer albums
2003 live albums
Universal Records live albums